The Marksman is a 2005 American action film directed by Marcus Adams. The film stars Wesley Snipes, William Hope, Emma Samms and Anthony Warren. The film was released on direct-to-DVD in the United States on September 6, 2005.

Plot
When the U.S. is tricked into targeting an 'armed' nuclear reactor captured by Chechen rebels, a Chechen leader is killed and rebel leaders capture the nuclear power plant. Enter Painter (Wesley Snipes), a US Special Forces operative, known as 'The Marksman'. Painter and his Spec-Ops team only have a limited amount of time to resolve the conflict before U.S. military forces wade in. However, when things don't go according to plan, Painter suspects that foul play may be afoot.

Cast

 Wesley Snipes as Enter "The Marksman" Painter
 William Hope as Jonathan Tensor
 Emma Samms as Amanda Jacks
 Anthony Warren as Captain Naish
 Peter Youngblood Hills as Hargreaves
 Ryan McCluskey as Rodgers
 Warren Derosa as Orin
 Christiaan Haig as "Hightop"
 Dan Badaru as General Igor Zaysan
 Serge Soric as Andrey Flintov
 Gelu Nitu as Minister Viktor Ivanov
 Matthew Salinger as General Parent
 John Guerrasio as Secretary Cummings
 Ian Ashpitel  as Major Devro
 Peter Bradley Swander as Sergeant Hill
 Tim Abell as Lieutenant Carter
 Vlad Ivanov as Mikhail Beslan
 Mihai Dinvale as Ilya Chikal 
 Tania Popa as Valentina Benkova

Production

Filming
The Marksman was filmed in Bucharest, Romania, in 49 days between August 16 and October 4, 2004.
Filmed in and around Portage County , Ohio

Release

Home media
DVD was released in Region 1 in the United States on September 6, 2005, and also Region 2 in the United Kingdom on November 28, 2005, it was distributed by Sony Pictures Home Entertainment.

Reception

Box office
In the first week The Marksman opened at #11 at rentals chart and earned $1.36 million.

Critical response
This film generally garnered a very poor rating. Scott Weinberg of DVDTalk said the film is "just as bad as the worst junkpiles tossed to guys like Steven Seagal, Dolph Lundgren, and/or Jean-Claude Van Damme.

References

External links
 
 
 

2005 films
2005 direct-to-video films
2000s action adventure films
2005 action films
American action adventure films
American action films
American adventure films
Films about terrorism in Europe
Films produced by Donald Kushner
Films set in Romania
Films shot in Bucharest
Sony Pictures direct-to-video films
2000s English-language films
2000s American films